Pizzo Taneda is a mountain of the Lepontine Alps, overlooking the Lago Ritom in the Swiss canton of Ticino. It lies between the valleys of Piora and Cadlimo and on the main Alpine watershed between the basin of the Rhine and that of the Ticino.

References

External links
 Pizzo Taneda on Hikr

Mountains of the Alps
Mountains of Switzerland
Mountains of Ticino
Lepontine Alps